Radioaxiom: A Dub Transmission is a collaborative album by Bill Laswell and Jah Wobble, released on September 18, 2001 by Axiom and Palm Pictures.

Reception
Critical reaction to Radioaxiom was generally positive. Thom Jurek of Allmusic wrote that the album's subtitle, A Dub Transmition was somewhat misleading as the album was not particularly influenced by dub reggae but taken on its own terms as a "mishmash of world musics and groove jazz [...] it works very well." He awarded Radioaxiom 4 stars out of a possible 5.

Track listing

Personnel 
Adapted from the Radioaxiom: A Dub Transmission liner notes.
Musicians
Aïyb Dieng – percussion
Hamid Drake – drums, tabla
Sly Dunbar – drums
Graham Haynes – cornet
Karsh Kale – drums, tabla
Bill Laswell – bass guitar, producer, mixing
Nils Petter Molvær – trumpet
Amina Claudine Myers – electric piano, organ
Ejigayehu Shibabaw – vocals
Tigist Shibabaw – vocals
Nicky Skopelitis – guitar
Jah Wobble – bass guitar, producer
Technical personnel
James Dellatacoma – assistant engineering
Michael Fossenkemper – mastering
James Koehnline – cover art
Robert Musso – engineering

Release history

References

External links 
 Radioaxiom – A Dub Transmission at Bandcamp
 

2001 albums
Collaborative albums
Jah Wobble albums
Bill Laswell albums
Albums produced by Bill Laswell
Albums produced by Jah Wobble
Axiom (record label) albums
Palm Pictures albums